The Eighth Creative Union (ECU) of Moscow Engineering Physics Institute (MEPhI) is a creative and interdisciplinary team unifying students, graduates, postgraduate students and the university lecturers and professors. The ECU implies a variety of activities including a student theatre of pop sketches, arrangement of concerts and performances, scriptwriting, arrangement of night entertainment events and conventions, issuing of wall newspapers along with prose, poetry and playwriting almanacs, participating in Singer-Songwriter Club and Club of the Funny and Inventive People and Sharp-witted activities and taking part in different shows and competitions.

History of the ECU

The Union was founded at Physics and Power Engineering Faculty of Moscow National Research Nuclear University MEPhI in accordance with the Faculty Komsomol (Young Communist League) Committee decree. Its stage debut was on 13 December 1969. That particular day is considered to be the official date of the ECU foundation. Its first President was Oleg Yurievich Fyodorov, a former captain of 1962 Institute CCS (Club of the Cheerful and Sharp-witted. ) team.

Traditions

First-year Student's Day is celebrated annually on 1 September. The ECU have conducted a theatrical performance for the first-year students of all faculties since 1 September 1974. Although the content of the performance changed throughout its history starting from parting words of ‘Scholar Elders’ to the first-year students, Higher Education game and amusement arcades to a concert of all on-stage performance groups of National Research Nuclear University MEPhI the ECU have constantly taken part in that important event.

Propaganda teams.
They are small creative ECU teams which used to go on tour to remote areas of the country in the Soviet times. The first propaganda team went to Naberezhnye Chelny in 1974 when Kamaz was being erected. The team members showed sketches, declared poems and sang hiking songs for the construction site workers. Afterwards, there had been a series of trips to different border military districts with concerts conducted for border patrol soldiers with the following agitation for entering the institute. The final trip of that sort was made in July 1989. We hope to breath a new life to that tradition.

MEPhI Club of the Funny and Inventive People.
It is an integral part of the ECU which was finally formed at the end of the 1990s. V. Shambarov remembers that "In 1969 when the ECU was established there were several groups of the guys. One group which included Kolya Artem’ev and Nina Gulova wanted to establish a theatre. The guys from the other group headed by Khutsiev wanted to take part in Club of the Funny and Inventive People (KVN) competition. As they had come to an agreement they established something in between, a theatre of KVN style."

Film and video production

In 1990 the ECU shot an introduction video of MEPhI KVN team required for participation in the First All-Union KVN Festival in Dnipropetrovsk (script by A. Selin, directed by A. Yazlovsky). It was a parody of  The Government Inspector by Nikolai Gogol. The action took place in the National Opera of Ukraine  and Alexander Maslyakov was thought to have been the Governor of the Town.

Rewards

 1975 performance "Thunderstorm"; written by V. Shambarov, directed by A. Golikov won the laureate title at Moscow contest devoted to the 30th anniversary of Eastern Front (World War II).

The ECU famous names

 Alekseev Erik is a satirical draughtsman, cooperated with Literaturnaya Gazeta in 1970s and was in charge of wall newspapers and stage decoration in the ECU.
 Kachalov Vladimir graduated from MEPhI with honors, worked at nuclear power plant BN-350 in Aktau then in the CPSU Central Committee, Cabinet of Ministers of the USSR and Ministry of Nuclear Energy of the Russian Federation. Presently he is the development director of OOO Intersertifika-TYuF. He was awarded with a prestigious Ivan Ilyin medal (the medal is named after a Russian philosopher). He was in charge of organizing affairs in the ECU.
 Khripko Anton is an actor, an author and a performer of a number of poems and short short stories, a theatre satirical draughtsman during his university days, an organizer and an administrator of the ECU First-May conventions and author of a popular book "How to Learn a Foreign Language" (2004), PhD in Economics and the owner of more than 40 invention patents issued both in the USSR and in Russia. 
 Khutsiev Mel’ko (1950–2013) is a publicist, writer, social and theatrical activist and Shcherbinka Legislative Assembly member. Also, he is of the founders of the ECU and the author of plays Woe to Him (1971) and We are here to stay (1974).
 Krutov Pavel is an actor, a screenwriter. He led the ECU from 2004 to 2006 and from 2009 to 2013. One of the organizers of the Interfaculty games KVN, Days of the Woodpecker and the Days of the Physicist.
 Philippov Victor is the leading actor of the ECU in 1970–1980, the main roles in several performances. One of the leaders of the first set of the ECU School in 1973–1974.
 Razumov Alexander is a writer, Fyodor Dostoyevsky scholar and an author of book ‘the Karamazov brothers. Read the unwritten sequel of the great novel’ (The Brothers Karamazov. Chitaem nenapisannoe prodolzhenie velikogo romana (2013). He was one of the ECU administrators during his university days, took part in the ECU performances "Woe to Him" (1971), "Divine Stories" (1973), "We are here to stay" (1974) and "Dragon" (1975).
 Selin Alexander (1958–2014) is a writer, stage director, literature activist and the author of two novels and storybook New Romantic (Noviy Romantik Russian: «Новый романтик»). Also he was one of the ECU administrators and an author of plays and short short stories. 
 Semyonov Arkadiy is a Russian rock poet, one of the founders of rock groups the "27th Kilometer" and the "Polite Refusal" (Russian: "Вежливый отказ") and an author of some of their songs. He was one of the ECU administrators and an author of plays and short short stories.
 Shabanov Viktor is a composer and singer of hiking songs and a composer of the music for We Are Here to Stay (1974) performance. 
 Shambarov Valery is a publicist, writer and an author of books on the Russian history and history of other countries.  He was one of the ECU administrators, a playwright, a stage director and the editor of Yellow Press (Russian: «Йеллоу пресс») self-published album.
 Sharov Eugene is an actor, poet, graphic designer of wall newspapers in the ECU in 1970–1980, head of the ECU agitation brigades on KAMAZ (1974) and in the construction team of the Kirillov (1977, 1978).
 Struev Sergey is Ph.D. in Engineering Science, an actor, a film and TV director, one of the ECU stage directors and the director of the ECU performances "Shell" (1982) and "Theatre of Social Horror" (1988).
 Turchaninov Nikolai is the author of texts, the poet and actor of the ECU in the 1990s. In recent years, he works as a practicing yoga trainer.

Bibliography

 Vetlina N. The ECU are performing. Gazeta Kamskie Zori (Kama Dawns), 27 July 1974, p. 4 (in Russian).
 Photo report on The First-year Student Day in MEPhI. Gazeta Moskovskiy Komsomolets (Moscow Comsomol Member), 8 September 1974, p. 4 (in Russian).
 Photo report on Winter Farewell Event by V. Stepanov. Gazeta Komsomolskaya Pravda (Komsomol Truth), 16 March 1977, p. 4 (in Russian).
 Photo report on MEPhI First-year Students’ Convention by V. Stepanov. Gazeta Komsomolskaya Pravda (Komsomol Truth), 17 September 1978, p. 4 (in Russian).
 Kozlov M., Tikhonov O. The Creative Union are celebrating jubilee. Gazeta Inzhener-fizik (Engineering Physicist), 23 December 1974, p. 2 (in Russian).
 Perezhogin V. Theater season of MEPhI students. Gazeta Inzhener-fizik (Engineering Physicist), 16 October 1976, p. 2 (in Russian).
 Tregubova E. Festival of Humour. Gazeta Inzhener-fizik (Engineering Physicist), 20 April 1974, p. 2 (in Russian).
 Sokolov A., Podkidyshev A. Unforgettable event. Gazeta Inzhener-fizik (Engineering Physicist), 6 October 1975, no. 30, p. 2 (in Russian).
 Levin A., Bystrov A. Beyond April Fool's Day traditions. Gazeta Inzhener-fizik (Engineering Physicist), 18 April 1986, p. 2 (in Russian).
 Chebykin R. KVN. Losing which was almost equal to winning. Gazeta Inzhener-fizik (Engineering Physicist), June 1998, no. 11–12, p. 8 (in Russian).
 Arkhipova E. Shambarov's buddy tales. Gazeta Inzhener-fizik (Engineering Physicist), June 1999, no. 10–11, p. 8 (in Russian).
 Matushkina A. Hurrah! We have won! Gazeta Inzhener-fizik (Engineering Physicist), June 1999, no. 10–11, p. 8 (in Russian).
 Kotel’nikov P. Convetion. Gazeta Inzhener-fizik (Engineering Physicist), September 1999, no. 12–13, p. 4 (in Russian).
 Matushkina A. You can do your utmost but the ECU will win anyway. Gazeta Inzhener-fizik (Engineering Physicist), November 1999, no. 16–18, p. 14 (in Russian).
 Kivinov A. Let's get acquainted. Gazeta Inzhener-fizik (Engineering Physicist), September 2001, no. 11–12, p. 4 (in Russian).
 Oganesyan A., Moskinov A. Let us be congratulated on. Gazeta Inzhener-fizik (Engineering Physicist), October 2001, no. 13–14, p. 5 (in Russian).
 Moskinov A. What if we join our efforts? Gazeta Inzhener-fizik (Engineering Physicist), December 2001, no. 16, p. 2 (in Russian).
 Moskinov A. Friendly match of century: MEPhI vs MSUCE. Gazeta Inzhener-fizik (Engineering Physicist), December 2001, no. 17–19, p. 5 (in Russian).
 Kalmykov P. MEPhI is 60 and I am 18. Gazeta Inzhener-fizik (Engineering Physicist), November 2002, no. 15–17, p. 5 (in Russian).
 Arephinkina R. We have won. Gazeta Inzhener-fizik (Engineering Physicist), no. 18–19, December 2004, p. 5 (in Russian).
 Chepurnova A. Physicists and lyricists with voice recorders. Zhurnal Studencheskiy Meridian (Student's Meridian) 2005, no. 8 (in Russian).
 Getmanova T. ECU veteran Gazeta Inzhener-fizik (Engineering Physicist), no. 14–16, October 2005, p. 4 (in Russian).
 Shal’nova I. They have taken part in competition in Sochi. Gazeta Inzhener-fizik (Engineering Physicist), February 2006, no. 1–2, p. 7 (in Russian).
 Sil’tsova V. В. Thank you MEPhI students for your support it helped me to stay on the top of the wave. Gazeta Inzhener-fizik (Engineering Physicist), no. 16–17, December 2013, p. 8 (in Russian).
 Lampskiy L. Physicist’s Days and not only that. Gazeta Inzhener-fizik (Engineering Physicist), no. 7–8, April 2014, p. 6 (in Russian).
 Krylov G. The Eighth Creative Union- who are these people?  Story about old organization with young team. Gazeta Inzhener-fizik (Engineering Physicist), no. 16–17, November 2014, p. 8 (in Russian).
 Krylov G., Struev S. Engineering actors and other A. Selin’s characters. Gazeta Inzhener-fizik (Engineering Physicist), March 2015, no. 5–6, p. 10 (in Russian).
 Litvinenko A. Physicist’s Days in National Research Nuclear University MEPhI. Gazeta Inzhener-fizik (Engineering Physicist), no. 7–8, April 2015, p. 8 (in Russian).
 Beshkenadze A. Let theatre be in KVN format.  
 Khutsiev M. Minor Booker prize. 
 Safaraliev G. First-year Students’ Event in Kolomenskoe.

References

External links
 The ECU MEPhI official website 
 
 The ECU MEPhI forum
 The ECU MEPhI in в YouTube

Theatre companies in Russia
Theatres in Moscow
Art Nouveau theatres
Culture in Moscow
Theatres completed in 1969